Angelo Pagotto (born 21 November 1973) is an Italian former footballer who played as a goalkeeper.

Career

Club
He reached the peak of his career in the 1996–97 season when he joined Serie A team A.C. Milan after spells with Sampdoria and Pistoiese. Giorgio Morini originally planned to use Pagotto as his first choice goalkeeper, but by the end of the season he was only second-choice behind Sebastiano Rossi. He spent just one season at Milan, making eight league appearances in the process, before moving on to fellow Serie A side Perugia.

Following a short stay at the Stadio Renato Curi, Pagotto had spells at Empoli and Reggiana in Serie B before returning to Perugia for another season. After his second run at the Umbrian outfit, he dropped down two divisions to play for the Serie C1/A side Triestina and was instrumental in their successful 2001–02 season that saw them finish runners-up and earn promotion to the Serie B.

He spent another season at Triestina, helping them finish 5th in their first season in Serie B since the 1990–91 season before dropping back down a division with Arezzo. Arezzo conceded just 27 times in 34 games in the 2003–04 season (with Pagotto playing on 30 occasions in the league) as they marched to the title, something Pagotto just missed out on two seasons earlier with Triestina. He remained their first choice goalkeeper in Serie B as Amaranto survived relegation.

Since leaving the Stadio Città di Arezzo in 2005, Pagotto has had spells with Torino and Grosseto, before ending his career at Crotone.

International
Pagotto was the first-choice goalkeeper for the Italy Under 21s national side between 1994 and 1996. He is a two-time winner of the UEFA European Under-21 Championship, both times under the guidance of then manager Cesare Maldini. He notched a total of ten caps for the Azzurrini. However, he was never capped with the Italian national team.

He was also part of the squad that competed at the 1996 Atlanta Olympics alongside Gianluigi Buffon, Fabio Cannavaro, Alessandro Nesta, Gianluca Pagliuca and Christian Panucci.

Drug scandal
On 28 April 2007, just before a game in the Serie B between Pagotto's Crotone and Spezia, Pagotto tested positive for cocaine. He pleaded guilty at a hearing on 30 July and was banned from professional football for life. He appealed and, on 14 September, his sentence was reduced to eight years. The ban expired in 2015, when he was 41.

Coaching career
In March 2019, Pagotto officially made his football comeback, accepting to join Lucchese as a goalkeeping coach. Later in 2019 he left Lucchese to sign for Avellino as a goalkeeping coach.

References

External links

1973 births
Living people
People from Verbania
Italian footballers
Olympic footballers of Italy
Footballers at the 1996 Summer Olympics
Serie A players
Serie B players
Serie C players
Italy youth international footballers
Italy under-21 international footballers
Association football goalkeepers
U.S. Pistoiese 1921 players
U.C. Sampdoria players
A.C. Milan players
A.C. Perugia Calcio players
Empoli F.C. players
A.C. Reggiana 1919 players
U.S. Triestina Calcio 1918 players
S.S. Arezzo players
Torino F.C. players
F.C. Grosseto S.S.D. players
F.C. Crotone players
Doping cases in association football
Footballers from Piedmont
Sportspeople from the Province of Verbano-Cusio-Ossola